KK Crvena zvezda is a men's professional basketball club based in Belgrade, Serbia. Crvena zvezda is a part of the Adriatic Basketball Association and competes in the ABA League, EuroLeague and in the Basketball League of Serbia. The Crvena zvezda squads have played in three different National Leagues since 1945, including the Yugoslav First Federal League (1945–1992), the First League of Serbia and Montenegro (1992–2006), and the Serbian League (2006 onwards). The team plays domestic home matches in the Aleksandar Nikolić Hall, and the EuroLeague or EuroCup home matches in Štark Arena. Since November 2022, the head coach has been Duško Ivanović.

There have been 42 head coaches in the club's history. Montenegrin coach Dejan Radonjić is the all-time leader in both official games coached and wins. Nebojša Popović won ten National Championships, while Radonjić won five National Cups and he is the only head coach who has won multiple Cup tournaments. Radonjić and Bratislav Đorđević won both national titles, a Championship and a Cup. Also, Crvena zvezda won five Adriatic Leagues under Radonjić and an Adriatic Super Cup under Milan Tomić. Coaches Radonjić and Tomić won the Adriatic Championship and the National Championship in the same season. Furthermore, Radonjić recorded three titles (Serbian League, Adriatic League, and Serbian Cup) in a single season four times (2014–15, 2016–17, 2020–21, and 2021–22), of which the lasest were back-to-back. Coach Aleksandar Nikolić won the only European-wide competition in the club's history, the FIBA European Cup Winner's Cup in 1974.

Nikolić, Ranko Žeravica, and Svetislav Pešić are members of FIBA Hall of Fame as coaches, while Nikolić is a member of Naismith Memorial Basketball Hall of Fame. American coach Tom Ludwig, hired in 1997, was the first foreign head coach and the only non-European. Montenegrins Radonjić and Duško Ivanović, and Slovenian Zmago Sagadin were the other foreign head coaches. Head coaches Vladislav Lučić and Aleksandar Trifunović were hired three times.

Head coaches Popović, Aleksandar Gec, Milan Bjegojević, Đorđe Andrijašević, Nikolić, Nemanja Đurić, Strahinja Alagić, Dragiša Vučinić, Zoran Slavnić, Lučić, Stevan Karadžić, Trifunović, Milenko Topić, and Saša Obradović were also Crvena zvezda's players. Popović and Vučinić were player-coaches, while Popović, Bjegojević and Topić won the National Championships both as the players and head coaches.

Key

Coaches
Note: Statistics are correct through the start of the 2022–23 season.

Head coaches with 100 games coached 
This list includes all head coaches who have coached at least 100 games in all competitions.

Note: Statistics are correct through the start of the 2022–23 season.

See also 
 List of Red Star Belgrade football coaches

Notes 

Former nationalities

Other nationalities

Other
 A running total of the number of coaches of Crvena zvezda. Thus, any coach who has two or more separate terms as head coach is only counted once.
  includes the Federal People's Republic of Yugoslavia (1945–1963) and the Socialist Federal Republic of Yugoslavia (1963–1992), while  includes Federal Republic of Yugoslavia (1992–2003) and State Union of Serbia and Montenegro (2003–2006).

References

Lists of Basketball League of Serbia head coaches by team
Crvena zvezda